Darebin United is a soccer club representing the City of Darebin based in Melbourne, Victoria.

History

In the city of Darebin, when you think grassroots  soccer, you think Darebin United Soccer Club. Darebin United Soccer Club was established in 1975 and is located in the heart of Darebin, Mayer Park.

Our Men’s Senior & Reserves teams are currently competing in Football Federation Victoria’s Men’s State League 4 competition and are looking to gain promotion back up to State League 3. 

In 2014 Darebin United Soccer Club introduced our very first Junior team and have since successfully added 12 more Junior teams to our Club. The Junior Teams that we currently cater for include:

Boys:   Mini Roos, Under 8's, Under 9's, Under 10's, Under 11's, Under 12’s, Under 13's, Under 14's, Under 16's and Under 17's

Girls:   Mini Roo's, Under 9's, tUnder 12's and Under 15's

We also have plans to introduce a Women's Teams to our Club and are on the lookout for coaches and players! Currently we have a Soccer Mum’s Team that is growing from strength to strength.

The club have endorsed an exciting strategy for 2022-2025 and are excited about the future ahead as we move towards our 50th anniversary.

We pride ourselves on being an inclusive and accessible club for everyone of all backgrounds. We are a Community Club for all!

If you are interested in joining our club please submit an expression of interest in the box below.

Darebin United Soccer Club is a non for profit club that have a strong focus on giving back to the community through charities and foundations. Any chance that we can help out the community we are always up for the challenge.

Divisional history

The Oz Football database was used as the source for 1995–2011 season results.

Rivalries

Darebin United shares a friendly rivalry with neighbouring side West Preston. When in the same division the two  clubs play off for the ‘Darebin Community Cup’ proudly supported by National Premier Leagues Victoria club Northcote City FC. The Cup was first contested in the 2014 season when the two teams met twice in the regular home and away fixture. Darebin United won the cup defeating West Preston comfortably 3–0.

2023 Squad List 
Coaching Team:

Senior Coach: Paul “Harold” Harris

Honours

2014 Victorian State League 4 North Runners-Up
2012 Victorian Provisional League 3 North-West Runners-Up
2003 Victorian Provisional League 1 North-West Runners-Up
1995 Victorian Provisional League 3 North-West Runners-Up

References

External links
 

Association football clubs established in 1970
1970 establishments in Australia
Soccer clubs in Melbourne
Greek-Australian culture in Melbourne
Sport in the City of Darebin
Diaspora sports clubs in Australia